The Appleseed Foundation is a nonprofit social justice network of centers in the United States and Mexico.

History
Appleseed was founded in 1993 by members of Harvard Law School's class of 1958 at their 35th reunion.

From the outset Appleseed was framed around what was then a singular approach to pro bono law. Its strategy was to address issues that lent themselves to system-wide reform rather than the traditional model of providing legal services to individuals with legal problems. While litigation is one tool used by some of the Appleseed Centers, the organization tends to focus on achieving structural changes through market-based reforms, policy analysis and research, legislation, and rule making.

Structure 
Appleseed's 17 Centers function as independent organizations linked to each other and with the national organization. They have achieved enduring accomplishment in areas ranging from children's welfare, education reform, criminal justice reform, juvenile justice, electoral reform, judicial independence, access to health care, immigrant justice, housing development, government accountability, and the integration of environmentalism and community development. Appleseed currently has Centers in Alabama, Chicago Appleseed, Connecticut, the District of Columbia, Georgia, Hawai`i, Kansas, Louisiana, Massachusetts, Missouri, Nebraska, New Jersey, New Mexico, New York, South Carolina, Texas, and Mexico.

Appleseed's network office is based in Washington, D.C. Appleseed helps promote Center work, serves as a clearinghouse of projects, and provides training and technical assistance, particularly in communications, development, project management and board development, as well as in the areas of education, immigration, financial access, health care and disaster recovery.

References

External links
Appleseed Foundation's official website

Ralph Nader
Criminal justice reform in the United States
1993 establishments in Washington, D.C.
Non-profit organizations based in Washington, D.C.
Organizations established in 1993
Legal advocacy organizations in the United States